The East Gothland Theatre (Swedish Östgötateatern) is Sweden's largest regional theatre, with stages in Norrköping and Linköping, both dating from the early 20th century, as well as touring companies. The repertoire includes Swedish and foreign drama, new plays, musicals, and classical theatre. 

Since 2010, the theatre has staged the European premiere of The Addams Family and the Scandinavian premieres of Come from Away and the musical Amélie.

History
The theatre in Linköping was opened in 1903, while the one in Norrköping, which is slightly larger, was opened in 1908 and is in the Art Nouveau style. On its front is the motto "Proclaim the sorrow of the ages - Proclaim the joy of the ages". Both are now called  Stora teatern, or Old Theatre, and were designed by Axel Anderberg.

The present-day combination has its origins in the Stadsteatern Norrköping-Linköping, established in 1947. The East Gothland County Theater Foundation was established in 1981 and took over from it.

Since 1 January 2016, the theatrical organization has been combined with the Norrköping Symphony Orchestra into a public collective now called Scenkonst Öst AB. The owners are the Regional Council and the municipalities of Norrköping and Linköping.

Notable productions
Come from Away (musical), from 26 September 2020, in Norrköping

Notable people
Bo Höglund (born 1948), member of the company
Inger Nilsson (born 1959), property master
Lars-Erik Liedholm (1928–1996), theatre director
Richard Carlsohn (born 1965), member of the company

Notes

1981 establishments in Sweden
Theatre companies in Sweden